Palpita curvispina is a moth in the family Crambidae. It was described by Zhang and Li in 2005. It is found in China (Sichuan, Guizhou).

The wingspan is 24–26 mm. The wings are white with ochreous marks, surrounded by a brownish black border.

Etymology
The species name is derived from Latin curv- (meaning curved) and spina (meaning thorn) and refers to the form of the distal cornutus in the aedeagus.

References

Moths described in 2005
Palpita
Moths of Asia